In inorganic chemistry, a Nowotny chimney ladder phase (NCL phase) is a particular intermetallic crystal structure found with certain binary compounds. NLC phases are generally tetragonal and are composed of two separate sublattices. The first is a tetragonal array of transition metal atoms, generally from group 4 through group 9 of the periodic table. Contained within this array of transition metal atoms is a second network of main group atoms, typically from group 13 (boron group) or group 14 (carbon group). The transition metal atoms form a chimney with helical zigzag chain. The main-group elements form a ladder spiraling inside the transition metal helix.

The phase is named after one of the early investigators H. Nowotny. Examples are RuGa2, Mn4Si7, Ru2Ge3, Ir3Ga5, Ir4Ge5 V17Ge31, Cr11Ge19, Mn11Si19, Mn15Si26, Mo9Ge16, Mo13Ge23, Rh10Ga17, and Rh17Ge22.

In RuGa2 the ruthenium atoms in the chimney are separated by 329 pm. The gallium atoms spiral around the Ru chimney with a Ga–Ga intrahelix distance of 257 pm. The view perpendicular to the chimney axis is that of a hexagonal lattice with gallium atoms occupying the vertices and ruthenium atoms occupying the center. Each gallium atom bonds to 5 other gallium atoms forming a distorted trigonal bipyramid. The gallium atoms carry a positive charge and the ruthenium atoms have a formal charge of −2 (filled 4d shell).

In Ru2Sn3 the ruthenium atoms spiral around the tin inner helix. In two dimension the Ru atoms form a tetragonal lattice with the tin atoms appearing as triangular units in the Ru channels.

The occurrence of a LCP phase can be predicted by the so-called 14 electron rule. In it the total number of valence electrons per transition metal atom is 14.

References

Intermetallics